Beam of Light is the second full-length album by the Japanese rock band One Ok Rock, released on May 28, 2008. It reached No. 17 on the Oricon weekly chart, and charted for six weeks before it dropped out.

Track listing

 Notes 
 "Abduction-Interlude" is an instrumental song.

Charts

Weekly charts

Personnel
One Ok Rock
 Takahiro "Taka" Moriuchi — lead vocals
 Alexander "Alex" Reimon Onizawa — lead guitar
 Toru Yamashita — rhythm guitar
 Ryota Kohama — bass guitar
 Tomoya Kanki — drums, percussion

References

2008 albums
One Ok Rock albums
Amuse Inc. albums